Schichlegruber Doing the Lambeth Walk is a 1942 short propaganda film by Charles A. Ridley of the UK Ministry of Information. It consists of edited existing footage taken from Leni Riefenstahl's Triumph of the Will to make it appear as if they were dancing to the dance style The Lambeth Walk.

The film was distributed uncredited to newsreel companies.

Alternative titles 
The film has many alternative titles:
 Hoch der Lambeth Valk
 Germany Calling
 Hitler Assumes Command
 Lambeth Walk
 Hoch Der Lambeth Walk
 Hoch der Lambeth Valk: A Laugh-Time Interlude
 Lambeth Walk – Nazi Style
 Hitler Doing the Lambeth Walk
 Schichlegruber – Doing the Lambeth Walk
 Gen. Adolf Takes Over
Panzer Ballet

Background 
The Lambeth Walk was becoming popular in Berlin. In a speech that achieved attention in 1939, a speech about "revolution of private life" (one of the next big tasks of National Socialism in Germany), a member of the Nazi Party declared it "Jewish mischief and animalistic hopping".

The name "Schichlegruber" derives from Adolf Hitler's father Alois Hitler, who was illegitimate and originally named Alois Schicklgruber after his mother, Maria Schicklgruber.

Reception 
The film reportedly enraged Joseph Goebbels to the degree that he ran out of the screening room kicking chairs and screaming profanities. Members of the Danish resistance would raid theatres and force the projectionists to show the film, among others.

As a humorous mashup that satirizes its original footage, the film shares similarities to 21st century remix culture, particularly that of the post-2006 YouTube Poop.

References

External links 
 "Lambeth Walk - Nazi Style" on YouTube
 

1942 films
British World War II propaganda films
British black-and-white films